Angus Creek is a stream in the municipality of Temagami in Nipissing District, Northeastern Ontario, Canada. It is in the Ottawa River drainage basin and is a right tributary of Rabbit Creek.

Course
The creek rises at Angus Lake in geographic Askin Township. It flows north-northeast under Highway 11 and continues north-northeast to a small unnamed pond. Angus Creek then flows east, takes in an unnamed right 
tributary, turns northeast to another small unnamed pond and heads east to its mouth at Rabbit Creek.

See also
List of rivers of Ontario

References

Rivers of Temagami